The sepia-capped flycatcher (Leptopogon amaurocephalus) is a species of bird in the family Tyrannidae.

It is found in Argentina, Belize, Bolivia, Brazil, Colombia, Costa Rica, Ecuador, French Guiana, Guatemala, Guyana, Honduras, Mexico, Nicaragua, Panama, Paraguay, Peru, Suriname, and Venezuela. Its natural habitats are subtropical or tropical moist lowland forests and heavily degraded former forest.

References

sepia-capped flycatcher
Birds of Central America
Birds of South America
sepia-capped flycatcher
Taxonomy articles created by Polbot